"I Need Your Love Tonight" is a song recorded by Elvis Presley and released as a single written by Sid Wayne and Bix Reichner. It was published by Elvis Presley's company Gladys Music, Inc.

Background
Elvis Presley recorded the song on June 10, 1958, in RCA Studios, Nashville, Tennessee. It was the second of multiple single releases recorded at a final session conducted just prior to him leaving the US for Germany to serve in the United States Army; he would not return to a recording studio until the spring of 1960.

The song reached number four on the Billboard pop singles chart in 1959. Released as a double A-side with "A Fool Such as I", the song reached No. 1 in the UK Singles Chart in May 1959 for five weeks.

"I Need Your Love Tonight" b/w "(Now And Then There's) A Fool Such As I" was Presley's first single to not receive a 78 RPM pressing in the United States.

In popular culture
In 1985, Alvin and the Chipmunks recorded a version inspired by Presley titled "I Need That Gold Tonight" for international versions of the Alvin and the Chipmunks episode "The Gold of My Dreams".

The song is featured in the 2005 film Lilo & Stitch 2: Stitch Has a Glitch.

References

Elvis Presley songs
1959 singles
Songs written by Sid Wayne
1958 songs
RCA Records singles